Black Widow is the name of several fictional characters appearing in American comic books published by Marvel Comics. Most of these versions exist in Marvel's main shared universe, known as the Marvel Universe.

Claire Voyant

Claire Voyant is the first costumed, superpowered female protagonist in comic books. Created by writer George Kapitan and artist Harry Sahle, she first appeared in Mystic Comics #4 (Aug. 1940). She kills evildoers to deliver their souls to Satan, her master. The character is unrelated to the later Marvel Comics superheroines who took on the codename.

Natasha Romanoff

Natasha Romanoff is the first character to take on the Black Widow codename in the modern mainstream Marvel Comics. She was created by  editor and plotter Stan Lee, scripter Don Rico and artist Don Heck, and first appeared in Tales of Suspense #52 (April 1964). The character has been associated with several superhero teams in the Marvel Universe, including the Avengers, the Defenders, the Champions, S.H.I.E.L.D., and the Thunderbolts. She has appeared in many other forms of media, including the major motion pictures Iron Man 2, The Avengers, Captain America: The Winter Soldier, Avengers: Age of Ultron, Captain America: Civil War, Avengers: Infinity War, Avengers: Endgame and Black Widow, wherein she is portrayed by Scarlett Johansson.

Yelena Belova

Yelena Belova is the second character to take on the Black Widow codename in the modern mainstream comics who debuted briefly in Inhumans #5 (March 1999) and was fully introduced in the 1999 Marvel Knights mini-series Black Widow. A second miniseries, also titled Black Widow and featuring Natasha Romanoff and Daredevil, followed in 2001. The next year, she did a solo turn in her own three-issue miniseries titled Black Widow: Pale Little Spider under the mature-audience Marvel MAX imprint. This June to August 2002 story arc, by writer Greg Rucka and artist Igor Kordey, was a flashback to the story of her being the second modern Black Widow, in events preceding her Inhumans appearance. Florence Pugh portrays Yelena in the MCU film Black Widow and the Disney+ miniseries Hawkeye.

Publication History, List of Titles

Marvel Knights Grayson & Rucka Era 
Black Widow Volume 1 (Marvel Knights; June - August 1999) Legacy #1-3

Black Widow Volume 2 (Marvel Knights; "Breakdown Parts 1-3"; January - March 2001) #1-3 [Legacy #4-6]

Black Widow: Pale Little Spider Volume 1 (MAX Comics; June - August 2002) #1-3
 Collected in Marvel Knights Black Widow by Grayson & Rucka (October 2018)

Marvel Knights "Homecoming" & "The Things They Say About Her" Story-line 
Black Widow Volume 3 "Homecoming" (Marvel Knights, By Morgan & Sienkiewicz; November 2004 - April 2005) #1-6 [Legacy #8-12]

Black Widow: The Things They Say About Her Volume 1 (Marvel Knights; November 2005 - April 2006) #1-6 [Legacy #13-18]
 Collected in Black Widow: Welcome to the Game (January 2020)

Black Widow: Deadly Origin & Marvel Legacy -Canon Series 
Black Widow: Deadly Origin Volume 1 (Miniseries; January - April 2010) #1-4

Black Widow Volume 4 (June 2010 - January 2011)  [Legacy #1-8]

Widowmaker Volume 1 (By Jim McCann and David Lopez; Miniseries; February - April 2011) #1-4
 Collected in Black Widow: Widowmaker (January 2020)
 Fear Itself: Black Widow #1 (August 2011)
 Black Widow Saga #1 (March 2010)
 Material from Enter the Heroic Age #1
 Material from Iron Man: Kiss and Kill #1
Black Widow Volume 5 (March 2014 - September 2015) #1-20 [Legacy #9-28]
Collections include- Black Widow Vol. 1: The Finely Woven Thread (July 2014)
Black Widow Vol. 2: The Tightly Tangled Web (January 2015)
Black Widow Vol. 3: Last Days (Sept. 2015)
Black Widow Volume 6 (May 2016 - May 2017) #1-12 [Legacy #29-40]
 Black Widow by Waid & Samnee: The Complete Collection (March 2020)
Black Widow Volume 7 "No Restraints Play" (Miniseries; March 2019 - July 2019) #1-5
Black Widow: No Restraints Play (July 2019)
Widowmakers: Red Guardian and Yelena Belova #1 (November 2020)

Black Widow Volume 8 (November 2020 - June 2022) #1-15 [Legacy #41-55]
 Black Widow by Kelly Thompson: The Ties That Bind (April 2021)
 Black Widow by Kelly Thompson: I Am the Black Widow (October 2021)
 Black Widow by Kelly Thompson: Die by the Blade (May 2022)

Alternative universe versions

Monica Chang

Monica Chang-Fury is the second character to use the Black Widow codename in the Ultimate Marvel continuity, debuting in Ultimate Comics: Avengers #3.

Jessica Drew

The Ultimate version of Jessica Drew is a female Spider-Clone who uses by the Black Widow alias.

Black Widow 2099
The futuristic 2099 version of Black Widow is an African-American woman named Tania. She operates as part of the Avengers 2099 at the Alchemax corporation's behest. Like black widow spiders, she literally eats her mates after having sex with them.

In other media
 Agent Carter features Dottie Underwood (Bridget Regan), a 1946 precursor to Black Widow and an operative of Leviathan.
 A character loosely inspired by Black Widow 2099 named Layla appears in the Avengers Assemble episode "Into the Future", voiced by Jennifer Hale. This version is a guerrilla warfare-styled resistance fighter from a future ruled by Kang the Conqueror.

See also 
 List of Black Widow characters

References 

 
Set index articles on comics
Marvel Comics female superheroes
Articles about multiple fictional characters